Muddu Bidda is a 1956 Telugu-language drama film directed and produced by K. B. Tilak. It is a debut film for Tilak under the banner Anupama Films.

It is remade into the Hindi language as Chhoti Bahu in 1971, directed by K. B. Tilak himself. The story is originally based on a Bengali novel Bindur Chhele written by the famous Bengali author Saratchandra Chatterjee.

Cast 
 Jamuna – Radha, wife of Madhu
 Jaggayya	- Doctor Madhu, younger brother of Seshayya
 V. Nagayya – Seshayya
 G. Varalakshmi
 Lakshmirajyam – Seetha, wife of Seshayya
 C. S. R. Anjaneyulu – Zamindar
 Ramana Reddy
 Suryakantham

Soundtrack

References

External links 
 

1956 films
1950s Telugu-language films
Telugu films remade in other languages
Films scored by Pendyala Nageswara Rao
Films directed by K. B. Tilak
Films based on Indian novels
Indian black-and-white films